The Anaang (also spelled Annang and Ànnang) are an ethnic group in southern Nigeria, whose land is primarily within 8 of the present 31 local government areas in Akwa Ibom State: Abak, Essien Udim, Etim Ekpo, Ika, Ikot Ekpene, Obot Akara, Oruk Anam, Ukanafun in Akwa Ibom State. The Anaang are the second largest ethnic group in Akwa Ibom state.

The Anaang were formerly located in the former Abak and Ikot Ekpene Divisions of the Anaang Province, as well as part of the former Opobo Division of Uyo Province, in the former Eastern Region of Nigeria. The proper name for the Ika of Akwa Ibom is Ika-Annang.

History

Oral history
According to oral tradition, the Abiakpo came to the northern range of Anaang from Eka Abiakpo. They were quickly followed by the Ukana clan, the Utu, Ekpu, Ebom and Nyama (the British lumped these groups together and gave them the name Otoro), and other Anaang clans. The Anaang and the entire people of Akwa Ibom and Cross River States of Nigeria (AkwaCross people) have occupied their land in the coastal Southeastern Nigeria for thousands of years.

The group is related to the Efik people. Migration brought the groups to live among the Twi of Ghana where the name Anaang means "fourth son". From Ghana, the group moved eastward into present-day Cameroon. It was in the Cameroon highlands that the group broke off but later arrived at same territory in the Coastal Southeastern Nigeria. Lineages were recognized and the groups organized themselves into clans based on old family origins known as Iman, a similar structure extends into the land of their northern neighbors, the Igbo.

Written history
Very little was written about the Anaang people before the mid-19th century. Early European traders who arrived in the cross river territories referred to groups who lived outside of the coastal areas as residents of Egbo-Sharry Country. The first written mention of the Anaangs is in Sigismund Koelle's account of liberated slaves in Sierra Leone. He mentioned a liberated slave named Ebengo who hailed from Nkwot in Abak. Ebengo was captured and sold to the Portuguese but was subsequently freed by a British warship and later settled in Waterloo, Sierra Leone. The British soldiers listed the languages spoken by the slaves in that captured ship as "Anaang". The second mention is a description of what is known as the Ikot Udo Obong Wars. The British described the killings of the Anaangs by King Jaja of Opobo as a punishment for defying his orders and trading in palm oil directly with the British merchants instead of going through him as a middle man. In the war that ensued, the British intervened and with the help of the Anaangs, they captured King Jaja and exiled him to the West Indies. The British established a military post at Ikot Ekpene in 1904.

Following British colonialism and with changes and ban in ancient hunting practices, the Anaang witnessed attacks by wild animals. As the men went to fight in World War II these attacks intensified. The British authorities called the attacks murder and blamed it on "the barbarism of the Africans". The Anaang were accused of belonging to a secret society called Ekpeowo (The Human Leopards Society). It has been argued that killings born out of insurgency against the British elsewhere in Africa led to the branding of leopard attacks as murders by the British authorities among the Anaang. Between 1945 and 1948 about 196 people were killed in Ikot Okoro community in the present-day Oruk Anam LGA; the Ikot Okoro Police station was set up because of this reason. The British convicted 96 people and executed 77 innocent people. The Anaang religion called Idiong was banned and the priests arrested. Articles and worship materials were publicly burnt and those who did not convert to Christianity automatically became suspects.

The Anaangs have a history and reputation for fearlessness and the ability of villages and clans to bind together to fight a common enemy. This is perhaps why they were able to thrive living so close to the Aro Confederacy's center, Arochukwu with its famed Ibini Ukpabi oracle. A particular interesting war group, or "Warrior cult", was the famous Oko warriors. This war group was highly functional in the 1950s. These warriors were considered invulnerable to penetration of knives, spears, and arrows. In various instances sharp machetes were tested on the body parts of members.

The Anaangs suffered genocide during the Nigerian Civil War. The war lasted for three years (1967–1970) and the Anaang lost a significant number of its people. The effect of the war and the resulting neglect of the Anaang is now a serious political issue and a source of unrest in the area

Location
The Anaang people homeland is located in Akwa Ibom State, Southern Nigeria. The Annangs have lived in the Southeastern, coastal parts of Nigeria for centuries before the arrival of the Europeans. The political capital of the Anaang people is Ikot Ekpene Local Government Area.

Culture

Anaang society is matrilineal. Individuals locate their place in the social world from the Ilip, literally translated as "womb". Thus a brother/sister from the same Ilip means that they can trace their origin to the same mother or father. Those who can so trace their ancestry to the same parents form Ufok (literally a house or compound). Several ufoks make up Ekpuks or extended family and several Ekpuks (extended families) make up "Ilung" (meaning village) and several villages make up the "abie" or clan. This is in many ways similar to the system used by other south eastern Nigerian 
peoples but more centralized.

Leadership at the family, lineage, village, or clan level remains the prerogative of the men, and lineage ties extends to women even after marriage. There are many societies and associations (Ulim also called "udim") for men and women which are very important in traditional village life. Individuals are measured by both the number and types of memberships in Ulim and by the achievements of one or more Ulims.  Governance is done by elderly males who act as the legislative arm called Afe Ichong, directed by the Abong Ichong (Village Chief and Clan Chief) who is the head and the chief executive but without the authority beyond what the Afe Ichong gives. A chief can be appointed by the Afe or can be an inherited office.

The Anang speak the Annang language and perform a masquerade after the yam harvest to mark the visit of ancestral spirits, or ekpo. This is also the name of a men's associations that once had great influence among Ibibio groups. The Anang carve masks with grotesque features, known as iliok, which are considered dangerous and may only be viewed by members of the ekpo. Other masks embody the beautiful spirit, or mfon.

The strength of any individual, family (or group for that matter) is typically based upon a consensus of the village or clan through this complex social system.  In all this, Anang women are not completely subordinate to men.  Instead Anaang women are partners and leaders in many aspects of Anaang tradition, including serving as female chief priests "Abia Iyong" in the Iyong cult or as healers in the healing cults.  The first-born female known as Aliaha is important and commands respect in the family and lineage.  Some traditions hold that a woman's first birth should take place in her mother's compound.  Women's organizations such as "abi-de" and "Nyaama", and "Isong Iban"  play important roles in giving the women voice and status in society. There are no traditional or cultural barriers that prevent women from attaining high offices or positions.

Anaangs value the ability to speak well and oratory ability using proverbs is highly desirable, especially among the leaders. The American anthropologist, Peter Farb, stated that the name "Anaang" among this group means "they who speak well". An individual who has the gift of eloquent speech is often complimented as Akwo Anaang, meaning the "Man of Anaang".

Fattening room
The fattening room is traditionally where virgin adolescent girls were fattened up in preparation for marriage. A fattening room girl is known as a mbobo. This was an occasion for a major village celebration. As part of her preparation for marriage the girl was also instructed on how to be a wife. She would spend her time in the room naked so that her fattening could be observed, and would sleep on a bamboo bed which was thought to fatten her up. It was also meant to make it more possible for her to conceive easily.

This use for fertility purposes was also used at time for infertile wives and as a prerequisite for entrance into secret societies.

Written language
The Annang language is also mutually intelligible to speakers of Ibibio, Efik, Oron, Eket (also known as Ekid) of the Akwa Akpa (Old Calabar Kingdom). Though the Anaang speech pattern was not written down, linguists have now produced an orthography of the language which makes it possible to produce written materials in the language (Idem & Udondata, 2001).

Demographics
Nigeria
Akwa Ibom State
Cross River State
Benue (Efik-Ibibio people were the fourth largest ethnic group of the original settlers of Benue of Nigeria)
Equatorial Guinea (formerly Fernando Po)
Cameroon
Ghana

Overseas diaspora:
Cuba
West Indies

Annang numbers 
Numbers from zero to twelve:

See also
Akamkpa
Bakassi
Ekpe
Ekpo Annang
Ikom
Nsibidi
Oron people

References

Bibliography
Brink, P. J. (1989) The Fattening Room among the Annang of Nigeria. Medical Anthropology 12 (1) p. 131 - 143.
Ekanem, J. B. (2002) Clashing Cultures: Annang Not(with)standing Christianity: An Ethnography (Gods, Humans, and Religions, No. 3),  Peter Lang Publishing: Brussels. .
Enang, K. (1987) Some Key Religious concepts of the Annang. In Africana Marburgensia: Cross River Religion, Hackett, R. I. J. (ed) Sonderheft 12 (12) 21 – 34.
Koelle, W. (1854) Polyglotta African Cited in Udo, E. U. (1983) The History of the Annang People, Apcon Press Ltd. Calabar, Nigeria.
Livingstone, W. P. (1916) Mary Slessor of Calabar: Pioneer Missionary, BiblioBazaar, .
Meek, C. K. (1937) Law and Authority in a Nigerian Tribe. Oxford, England. Oxford University Press .
Noah, Monday Effiong (1988) Proceedings of the Ibibio Union 1928-1937.

Nair, Kaanan. K. (1972) Politics and society in South Eastern Nigeria, 1841–1906;: A study of power, diplomacy and commerce in Old Calabar (Cass library of African studies. General studies), London, Frank Cass, .
Pratten, D. (2007) The Man-Leopard Murders: History and Society in Colonial Nigeria. Indianapolis, Indiana University Press. 
Udondata, J & Idem-Agozino, U. (2001) Annang Orthography, Uyo, Scholars Press.
Udo, E. U. (1983) The History of the Annang People, Calabar, Nigeria. Apcon Press Ltd.
Umoh, E. (2004) Annang Map with Boundaries, Plano TX. USA.
Waddell, H.M. (1893) Thirty Nine Years in West Africa and the West Indies. London. Frank Cass Ltd.

External links

Annang Heritage Organization

Annang
Ethnic groups in Nigeria